Klang is a tambon (subdistrict) of Det Udom District, in Ubon Ratchathani Province, Thailand. In 2021, it had a population of 14,470 people. Neighbouring subdistricts are (clockwise from the south) Non Sombun, Non Sawan, Top Hu, Tha Pho Si, Mueang Det, Phon Ngam, Kham Khrang, and Bua Ngam.

History
In 1907, Klang village was the administrative center of a former district "Matchim Det Udom" (มัชฌิมเดชุอดม; Central Det Udom), which was later merged with three other districts, Prajim Det Udom (ปจิมเดชอุดม; Western Det Udom), Uthai Det Udom (Eastern Det Udom), and Dom Pradit, to create a new district, Det Udom district in 1912.

In 1972, together with five villages split from Na Chaluai, five of the villages in Klang were broke off to form a new subdistrict, Non Sombun, which currently is a tambon in Na Chaluai district.

In 1976, a village on the bank of the Lam Dom Yai River, Waree Udom (วารีอุดม), was split off to establish a new subdistrict, Tha Pho Si, by combining with five other villages on the other side of the river, which had been split from Mueang Det.

In 1979, the eastern region became an independent subdistrict, Bua Ngam.

Geography
The tambon is located in the mid-east region of Det Udom district, which is the river plain of the Lam Dom Yai river.

Administration
The tambon is divided into twelve administrative villages (mubans; หมู่บ้าน) which are further divided into eighteen community groups (Mu; หมู่). All of which were governed by the Subdistrict Administrative Organization of Kham Khrang (องค์การบริหารส่วนตำบลกลาง).

The following is a list of the subdistrict's mubans, which roughly correspond to the villages:

References

Tambon of Ubon Ratchathani Province